Tang Wang Yip or Wang Yip Tang (Simplified Chinese:邓宏业; Traditional Chinese: 鄧宏業) (born June 5, 1984) is a cyclist from Hong Kong.

Palmares

2006
2nd Tour of South China Sea
2007
 Hong Kong Time Trial Champion
1st Tour of South China Sea
1st stage 1
2008
1st stage 4 Tour of South China Sea
2009
1st East Asian Games Road Race
3rd East Asian Games Team Time Trial 
2010
 Hong Kong Road Champion

References

1984 births
Living people
Hong Kong male cyclists
Cyclists at the 2006 Asian Games
Asian Games competitors for Hong Kong